Peter Büttner (born 26 July 1936) is a Swiss speed skater. He competed in the men's 5000 metres event at the 1964 Winter Olympics.

References

1936 births
Living people
Swiss male speed skaters
Olympic speed skaters of Switzerland
Speed skaters at the 1964 Winter Olympics
Sportspeople from Zürich